Gheraldine Quijada was part of the Venezuela women's national volleyball team that competed at the 2008 Summer Olympics in Beijing, China.

See also
 Venezuela at the 2008 Summer Olympics

References

External links
Gheraldine Quijada at Sports Reference
http://www.fivb.org/EN/Volleyball/Competitions/Olympics/2008/W/Photos/PhotoGallery.asp?Tourn=WOG2008&No=14
http://www.gettyimages.ca/detail/news-photo/venezuelas-gheraldine-quijada-and-aleoscar-blanco-fail-to-news-photo/82231183#venezuelas-gheraldine-quijada-and-aleoscar-blanco-fail-to-block-a-picture-id82231183
http://www.scoresway.com/?sport=volleyball&page=player&id=5118

1988 births
Living people
Venezuelan women's volleyball players
Place of birth missing (living people)
Volleyball players at the 2008 Summer Olympics
Olympic volleyball players of Venezuela